Discina perlata, commonly known as pig's ears is a brown to tannish, wrinkled, cup- or ear-shaped fungus, sometimes with short, stout stalk. The spores of D. perlata are quite similar to those of mushrooms in the genus Gyromitra, so that some mycologists classify it there.

Description 
The cup is often wrinkled to convoluted, with the edges turned downward. The flesh is brittle.

It is considered edible by some authors, but not others; it can be confused with other potentially toxic species. It should be cooked before consumption.

Microscopic characteristics 
The spores are 30–35 x 12–14 μm, spindle shaped, minutely warted, with three oil drops and knobs at each end, located in the cup.

Similar species 
Disciotis venosa is more deeply veined, and has smooth spores; it is typically found in deciduous woods.  Other similar species of Discina must be differentiated microscopically. Peziza repanda is also similar. In the Pacific Northwest, D. leucoxantha and D. olympiana are similar.

Habitat and distribution 
It is found singularly or in groups, on humus or rotten wood in coniferous areas; near melting snowbanks in western mountains. It is found in temperate areas of North America. It comes into fruiting from May–July.

References 

  Lincoff, GH National Audubon Society Field Guide to North American Mushrooms. Chanticleer Press, Inc.  1981 p. 331 

Discinaceae